The Journal of Prosthodontics is a peer-reviewed medical journal covering prosthodontics and restorative dentistry. It is published by John Wiley & Sons on behalf of the American College of Prosthodontists and the editor-in-chief is Radi Masri (University of Maryland). It is the official publication of the American College of Prosthodontists, the organization of dentists with advanced specialty training who create optimal oral health.

Abstracting and indexing 
The journal is abstracted and indexed in Index Medicus/MEDLINE/PubMed and CINAHL.

References

Dentistry journals
Surgery journals
Wiley (publisher) academic journals
English-language journals
Publications established in 1992
9 times per year journals